Vincenzo Franchitti (born 22 May 1950) is an Italian former professional tennis player.

Franchitti competed on the international tour in the 1970s and was a two-time Florence quarter-finalist.

His best career win came against Björn Borg at the Bologna Indoor in 1974, which made him one of only two Italians to defeat the Swede during his career, along with Adriano Panatta.

References

External links
 
 

1950 births
Living people
Italian male tennis players